Salonica Eyalet was an eyalet of the Ottoman Empire.

Administrative divisions
Sanjaks of the Eyalet in the mid-19th century:
 Sanjak of Tirhala (Trikala)
 Sanjak of Selanik (Thessalonica)
 Sanjak of Siroz (Serres)
 Sanjak of Drama

Governors
Governors of the eyalet:

 Mehmed Hasib Pasha (September 1839 - February 1840)
 Mehmed Emin Pasha (February 1840 - July 1840)
 Kizilhisarli ömer Pasha (July 1840 - July 1843)
 Sirozlu Ibrahim Pasha (July 1843 - October 1843)
 Gürcü Mehmed Vasif Pasha (October 1843 - September 1845)
 Gümrükcü Mehmed Salih Pasha (September 1845 - April 1846)
 Kara Osmanzade Yaqub Pasha (April 1846 - May 1847)
 Dede Mustafa Hifzi Pasha (May 1847 - September 1848)
 Egribozlu Ebubekir Sami Pasha (September 1848 - August 1849)
 Cihan Seraskeri Hasan Riza Pasha (August 1849 - July 1850)
 Kara Osmanzade Yakub Pasha (July 1850 - November 1851)
 Celalatzade/Evrenoszade Yusuf Siddiq Mehmed Pasha (November 1851 - May 1853)
 Gümrükcü Mehmed Salih Pasha (May 1853 - July 1853)
 Ebubekir Rüstem Pasha (August 1853 - February 1854)
 Bosnakzade Mehmed Reshid Pasha (February 1854 - July 1854)
 Arnavud Mazhar Osman Pasha (July 1854 - September 1855)
 Sirkatibi Mustafa Nuri Pasha (September 1855 - May 1856)
 Ahmed Nazir Pasha (May 1856 - May 1857)
 Abdi Pasha (1857)
 Yozgatli Mehmed Vecihi Pasha (October 1857 - September 1858)
 Mirza/Tatar Mehmed Said Pasha (November 1858 - August 1859)
 Tepedelenlizade Ismail Rahmi Pash (August 1859 - January 1860)
 Arnavud Mehmet Akif Pasha (1st time) (January 1860 - January 1865)
 Huseyin Hüsnü Pasha (January 1865 - December 1866)
 Ahmed Ala Bey (1867)

References

Eyalets of the Ottoman Empire in Europe
1826 establishments in the Ottoman Empire
1867 disestablishments in the Ottoman Empire